IBM Champions are individuals, non-IBMer and recognized professionals in the IBM community.

History and Organization  
IBM has introduced the IBM Champion program back in 2008, initially only in the IBM Information Management Software division. The program describes itself as:

The IBM Champion program recognizes innovative thought leaders in the technical community — and rewards these contributors by amplifying their voice and increasing their sphere of influence. An IBM Champion is an IT professional, business leader, developer, or educator who influences and mentors others to help them make best use of IBM software, solutions, and services.

As of today, the program has elected 484 professionals across the globe. As of 2018, champions are divided in 6 groups:
 IBM Analytics Champions (merger of Business Analytics and Information Management)
 IBM Cloud Champions
 IBM Collaboration & Talent Champions (ICS)
 IBM Power Systems Champions
 IBM Storage Champions
 IBM Z Champions

IBM Champions are nominated by their peers. An IBM internal committee publishes the results once a year and the title is valid for one year. The champion needs to be nominated every year.

References 

IBM